This is a list of NCAA Division I men's basketball tournament Final Four appearances by school. Several teams have vacated Final Four appearances and are marked with an * with explanations listed below. The listed Final Four totals for those teams do not include the vacated appearances. Schools in italics no longer compete in NCAA Division I.

Teams listed in bold are active in the 2023 NCAA tournament

Total Final Four appearances

Minnesota, Massachusetts, Saint Joseph's and Western Kentucky have had their only appearances in the Final Four vacated.

* - Indicates one vacated appearance not included in total.
** - Indicates two vacated appearances not included in total.

Most NCAA Tournament appearances without reaching a Final Four

* - Indicates one vacated Final Four appearance.

References

External links
 247 Sports: Teams with the most Final Four appearances

Appearances By School
College men's basketball records and statistics in the United States